Mycetochara binotata is a species of comb-clawed beetle in the family Tenebrionidae.

References

Further reading

External links

 

Alleculinae
Beetles described in 1824